Alan John Forey (born 1933) is reader emeritus in history at the University of Durham and an authority on the history of the military orders of the middle ages. In 1994, his work was collected and published in the Variorum Collected Studies series as Military Orders and Crusades.

Selected publications
The Templars of the "Corona de Aragón". Oxford University Press, Oxford, 1973.
"The Military Order of St Thomas of Acre", English Historical Review, 92 (1977), pp. 481–503. 
The Military Orders from the Twelfth to the Early Fourteenth Centuries. Macmillan, 1991. (New Studies in Medieval History) 
Military Orders and Crusades. 1994.  (Variorum Collected Studies)
"The Military Orders 1120-1312", in Jonathan Riley-Smith (Ed.) The Oxford Illustrated History of the Crusades. Oxford University Press, Oxford, 2001.

References

External links 
The Order of St Thomas of Acre by Dr. Alan Forey

1933 births
Living people
Military historians
Academics of Durham University
British medievalists